The 142nd district of the Texas House of Representatives contains parts of northeastern Houston. The current Representative is Harold Dutton Jr., who has represented the district since 1985.

References 

142